Hazard Lake is a lake in the U.S. state of Washington. 

Hazard Lake was named after Hazard Stevens, who operated a farm near the site.

References

Lakes of Thurston County, Washington